Tony Rigby (born 10 August 1972) is an English former professional footballer who played as a midfielder, making over 150 career appearances.

Career
Born in Ormskirk, Rigby played for Crewe Alexandra, Lancaster City, Burscough, Barrow, Bury, Scarborough and Shrewsbury Town.

Honours
Individual
 PFA Team of the Year: 1993–94 Third Division

References

1972 births
Living people
English footballers
Association football midfielders
Crewe Alexandra F.C. players
Lancaster City F.C. players
Burscough F.C. players
Barrow A.F.C. players
Bury F.C. players
Scarborough F.C. players
Shrewsbury Town F.C. players
English Football League players